Jerome Thomas Evans was a black high school football coach in the state of North  Carolina during the 1950s through the 1970s.  He became head football coach at Walter M. Williams High School in 1970, later serving as assistant principal. He died on August 13, 1995 in Burlington, North Carolina, United States  at the age of 65. 

Jerome Thomas Evans began his coaching career as head football, basketball and baseball coach at H.B. Sugg High School in Farmville, NC in 1954 at a time when there were only two football programs in the Pitt County area for African-American youth. His period of service at Walter M. Williams High School is documented in the book Black Coach by Pat Jordan.

Book references
 Black Coach, Pat Jordan, Dodd-Mead 1971

Year of birth missing
1995 deaths
High school football coaches in North Carolina
Sportspeople from North Carolina
African-American coaches of American football